Kirsty Hawkshaw (born 26 October 1969) is an English electronic music vocalist and songwriter. In addition to her work as a solo artist, she is known as the lead vocalist of early 1990s dance group Opus III, and her collaborative work with other musicians and producers.

Career
Kirsty Hawkshaw is the daughter of the late British production music/film music composer and disco record producer Alan Hawkshaw, who was known for composing themes for TV programmes such as Grange Hill and Channel 4 game show Countdown. Her mother is German-born Christiane Bieberbach.

At a rave in 1990, she was noticed by producers Ian Munro, Kevin Dodds and Nigel Walton, who at the time were known as A.S.K. and were signed to MCA Records UK. The trio had released a single called "Dream", when she was invited to appear on stage as their dancer. It was through this meeting that they would form a dance act called Opus III. Their first single, a cover version of the song "It's a Fine Day" from their debut album Mind Fruit, was an international success and Top 10 hit on UK Singles Chart, and reached No. 1 on the US Billboard Hot Dance Music/Club Play chart in 1992. A reversed sample of Hawkshaw's singing from this track was used in the Orbital track "Halcyon", the music video for which featured Hawkshaw. Opus III also had another US number 1 hit on the same chart in 1994 with "When You Made the Mountain", from their second and final album, Guru Mother.

In a 2009 interview, she recalled her decision to end her association with Opus III, saying she felt that she did not want to be part of a "commercialized" act, wanted to go in a different direction, and felt that she did not have sufficient input in writing and production, which led to conflict with the rest of the band; she has also ruled out any plans for a reunion if it ever happens. She has also been critical of the dance music industry more broadly, especially performers lip synching other people's songs, and using original artists' vocals without permission or credit.

After the group broke up in 1994, Hawkshaw pursued a solo career and has since been in demand by other acts in the dance, house, Eurodance, trance, and electronica community, including Tiësto, Delerium, BT, Fragma, Seba, and Paradox, among others.

Her solo single "Fine Day" peaked at number 62 in the UK Singles Chart in November 2002.

Hawkshaw contributed a track titled "Telephone Song" to the children's compilation album For the Kids Too!, released in 2004.

On 10 October 2005, she released Meta-Message, a collection of older and newer songs, after a growing interest in her out-of-print album, O.U.T.

The record label Magnatune released her ambient album, The Ice Castle, in 2008.

Collaborations

 1992 "It's A Fine Day" (with Opus III)
 1992 "I Talk To The Wind" (with Opus III)
 1994 "When You Made The Mountain" (with Opus III)
 1996 "Valencia"  (with Rachid Taha)
 1997 "Isolation" (with Pulusha)
 1998 "State Of Grace" (with Swayzak)
 1999 "Stereo" (with Stereo People)
 2000 "Dreaming" (with BT) – UK No. 38
 2000 "Hidden Agenda" (with Sandor Caron)
 2000 "Inner Sanctum" (with Delerium)
 2000 "Nature's Kingdom" (with Delerium)
 2000 "Running Down The Way Up" (with BT & Hybrid)
 2000 "Visions" (with Ian Pooley)
 2000 "Where The Sidewalk Ends" (with Silent Poets)
 2001 "Battleship Grey" (with Tiësto)
 2001 "Urban Train" (with Tiësto) – UK No. 22
 2001 "Stealth" (with Way Out West) – UK No. 67
 2002 "Killing Me" (with Slovo)
 2002 "Sertão Blues" (with Slovo) 
 2002 "Whisper" (with Slovo)
 2002 "Underwater Lady" (with Harmonic 33)
 2003 "Blackout" (with Hybrid)
 2003 "Calling You" (with Ikon)
 2003 "Science Of Life" (ALBUM) (with Dave Hewson & Derek Austin)
 2004 "Don't Sleep Tonight" (with Clashing Egos)
 2004 "Just Be" (with Tiësto) – UK No. 43
 2004 "Walking On Clouds" (with Tiësto)
 2004 "Maris Stella" (with Digitonal)
 2004 "Sincere For You" (with Lange)
 2005 "All I Want" (with Hybrid)
 2005 "Faith In Me" (with Pole Folder)
 2005 "Halcyon And On And On (Live)" (with Orbital)
 2005 "Reach For Me" (with Jamie Cullum, Steve Isles)
 2005 "Split" (with Mr. Sam)
 2006 "Don't Look Behind You" (with Judie Tzuke)
 2006 "Fleeting Instant" (with Delerium)
 2006 "Just For Today" (with Hybrid)
 2006 "Insight" (with Mr. Sam)
 2006 "Lodestar" (with Mr. Sam)
 2006 "Lyteo" (with Mr. Sam)
 2006 "Love Is A Rose" (with Pentatonik)
 2006 "The Last One And The First" (with Pentatonik)
 2006 "Outsiders" (with Tenishia)
 2006 "Radio Waves" (with Fragma)
 2006 "The Chauffeur" (with Sleepthief)
 2006 "View To Me" (with Future Funk Squad)
 2007 "Beatitude" (with Duderstadt)
 2007 "Heaven Sent" (with Andrew Bennett)
 2007 "Loverush" (with Loverush UK!)
 2007 "Reasons To Forgive" (with Tenishia)
 2007 "Silent Stars" (with Pole Folder)
 2007 "Skimming Stones" (with Sleepthief)
 2007 "Star·Kindler" (with Delta-S)
 2007 "The Phoenix Effect" (with Delta-S)
 2007 "Time Is Running Out" (with Ikon)
 2007 "You Will Feel Love Again" (with OpenCloud)
 2008 "Fine Day 2008" (Kirsty Hawkshaw vs. Kinky Roland)
 2008 "Good To Be Alive (Healing Angel)" (Kirsty Hawkshaw vs. Arnold T.)
 2008 "Invisible" (with Tenishia)
 2008 "Invisible Walls" (collaboration with Nektarios and trance singer Jan Johnston) (Nektarios meets F-used)
 2008 "Juneau / Glaciation" (with Alaska)
 2008 "Love Calls" (with Headstrong)
 2008 "Love Is No Possession" (with JJoy)
 2008 "Love Like Blood / Sunbathing" (with Outrage and Aperture)
 2009 "Devotion" (with Seba)
 2009 "Face To Face" (Kirsty Hawkshaw vs. Elucidate)
 2009 "Fearless Soul (Hybrid Mix)" (with Harry Gregson-Williams & Hybrid) 
 2010 "A Million Stars" (with BT)
 2010 "Amzinai / Sundog" (with Alaska)
 2010 "One Day" (with Mr. Sam)
 2010 Two Trees EP: "After The Rain" / "Meteors" / "Dreaming Of Now" (with Ulrich Schnauss)
 2010 "The Joy (Face To Face)" (with Seba)
 2011 "Back In Time" (with Liquid Kaos)
 2011 "Clocks (Dandelions)" (with The Felt Dolls)
 2011 "Falling (Chillout)" (with Tenishia)
 2011 "Let Us Think" (with Secret Society & Outrage) 
 2011 "The Light" (with Seba & Paradox)
 2011 "Whisper" (with Blu Mar Ten)
 2012 "Connected" (with John B)
 2012 "Dawn" (with Nektarios)
 2013 "4K" (with Lii)
 2013 "Let It Go" (with Tobias Zaldua)
 2013 "Nothing Can Replace" (with Seba)
 2016 "Motion" (with Eshericks)
 2018 "The Sandshaper" (with Sleepthief)
 2018 "The Wood Beyond The Wall" (with Sleepthief)
 2019 "Smoke" (with Trance Arts and Jan Johnston)
 2019 “It’s A Fine Day 2K19”

References

External links
 
 
 Interview from 2005 by Progressive Sounds
 Interview from 2013 by TranceFixxed
 
 

1969 births
Living people
Singers from London
English women singer-songwriters
Trance singers
English dance musicians
English trance musicians
English people of German descent
English women in electronic music
21st-century English women singers
21st-century English singers